The Mitaka  (alternatively Mithaka) were an indigenous Australian people of the state of Queensland.

Country
Their eastern limits ran close to Monkira, while the western frontier was at Kalidawarry.

Alternative names
 Mithaka
 Mittaka.
 Mittuka.
 Marunga.
 Mit:aka. (putatively a Dieri exonym)
 Marrala/ Marranda (language names)
 Murunuta.
 Midaga.

Notes

Citations

Sources

Aboriginal peoples of Queensland